Godfrey I (died 1002), called the Prisoner or the Captive (le Captif), sometimes the Old (le Vieux), was the count of Bidgau and Methingau from 959 and the sovereign count of Verdun 963 to his death. In 969, he obtained the Margraviate of Antwerp and Ename. Between 974 and 998, he was also the sovereign count of Hainault and Mons. 

He was the founder of the House of Ardennes-Verdun, a cadet branch of the House of Ardennes. He was always loyal to the Ottonians, whom he was related to through his maternal grandmother.

Life
He was the son of Gozlin, Count of Bidgau and Methingau, and Oda of Metz. He was the brother of Adalberon, Archbishop of Reims, who crowned Hugh Capet the king of France.

In 974, he became count of Mons, and Hainault jointly with Arnold, Count of Valenciennes, after the fall of Reginar III. Charles, Duke of Lower Lorraine, was a supporter of Reginar and defeated Godfrey and Arnold at Mons in 976, where the former was captured.

After his release, he was at the side of the Emperor Otto II fighting Lothair of France at Verdun in 985, but he was again taken captive, along with his son Frederick, and held several years. He was released in 987 by Hugh Capet, whose political ally was Bishop Adalberon, Godfrey's brother, who had crowned Hugh. Godfrey continued to be an enemy of Charles of Lower Lorraine, Hugh's Carolingian rival.

In 989, he was made prisoner a third time by Herbert III of Vermandois. He was liberated before 995, when he appears at the synod of Mousson. In 998, he lost his Hainault portion (the county of Mons) to Reginar IV.

Family
In 963, he married Matilda, daughter of Herman, Duke of Saxony, of the Billung family, a widow of Baldwin III of Flanders. He had the following issue:

 Frederick (d. 1022), count of Verdun
 Godfrey (d. 1023), duke of Lower Lorraine (1012–1023)
 Adalberon (d. 988), bishop of Verdun (984–988)
 Herman of Ename (d. 1024), count of Brabant (retired as a monk in the abbey of Verdun abt. 1022)
 Gothelo (d. 1044), margrave of Antwerp, duke of Lower (1023–1044) and later also Upper (1033–1044) Lorraine
 Ermengarde (d. 1042), married Otto of Hammerstein, count in the Wettergau
 Probably Ermentrude, who married Arnold de Rumigny (d. 1010), lord of Florennes
 Adela, married Count Godizo of Aspelt.  Their daughter Irmgard married Berthold von Walbeck, son of Lothair I, Margrave of the Nordmark.

Notes

References 

10th-century births
1002 deaths
Year of birth unknown
House of Limburg
Counts of Mons
Counts of Bidgau
Counts of Methingau
Counts of Verdun
Margraves of Antwerp
Margraves of Ename
Lords of Bouillon
House of Ardenne–Verdun